The Rogers Brothers (Gus: 1869–1908; Max: 1873–1932) were two vaudeville performers in Jewish minstrelsy, who were also singers and had their own music publishing company. Their original surname was Solomon and their father Morris Solomon was a comedian. The brothers teaming was considered something of a rival to Weber & Fields.  Their highly successful travel or locale plays and musicals, staged in different towns and countries, were popular with vaudeville audiences until Gus's early death in 1908 ended the brothers' team partnership. The Rogers successful run of theme musicals anticipated the much later teaming of Bob Hope and Bing Crosby in their 'Road' movies.

Selected productions
The Rogers Brothers in Wall Street (1899)The Rogers Brothers in Central Park (1900–01)The Rogers Brothers in Washington (1901)The Rogers Brothers in Harvard (1902)The Rogers Brothers in London (1903–04)The Rogers Brothers in Paris (1904)The Rogers Brothers in Ireland (1905–06)The Rogers Brothers in Panama'' (1907)

References

External links

 
 

American musical duos
American comedy duos
Jewish American comedians
Vaudeville performers